Two Catalonias (Dos Cataluñas or Dos Catalunyas) is a 2018 documentary film directed by Álvaro Longoria and Gerardo Olivares, about the ideological differences surrounding the 2017 Catalan regional election in Spain. The film was released by Netflix on September 28, 2018.

Premise
The documentary follows the ideological differences surrounding the 2017 Catalan regional election in Spain through interviews and behind-the-door conversations. It covers the societal dynamics in the country resulting in a push for sovereignty with parliamentary declaration of independence, and aftermath following it.

Reception
The film was awarded the 2019 Cinema for Peace Award for Justice, however Longoria has stated that the award was returned after the ceremony due to what they felt was the politicisation of the ceremony by Catalonian ex-president Carles Puigdemont.

The LA Review of Books review suggested that Two Catalonias "seems to trade a thorough engagement with historical specificity for international appeal", and the headline in El Diario that it was a film for tourists.

Deciders US reviewer, found it "a vital and necessary document about current events that should be seen by anyone who feels so inclined", despite finding it disorientating due to its fragmentary coverage of the Catalan independence movement. Ready Steady Cut, which awarded it 3/5 stars, also found it "occasionally confounding".

References

External links

 
 
 

2018 documentary films
2018 films
2010s Spanish-language films
Netflix original documentary films